The 2016 MAC Championship Game was an NCAA Division I college football conference championship game for the Mid-American Conference (MAC). It was the 20th MAC Football Championship Game and was played at Ford Field in Detroit on Friday, December 2, 2016, televised on ESPN2. The game featured the East Division co-champion Ohio Bobcats against the outright West Division champion Western Michigan Broncos.

Teams
The Ohio Bobcats clinched their spot in the 2016 MAC Championship Game by beating Akron 9–3 in their final regular season game. They tied with divisional rival Miami for the East title, but advanced to the MAC title game by virtue of their 17–7 win at Miami on October 1. Under 12th year head coach Frank Solich, the Bobcats finished the regular season with an 8–4 record, with key wins coming against Kansas and Toledo. Ohio finished 1–1 against Power 5 teams; they lost to Tennessee (from the SEC) and beat Kansas (from the Big 12).

The Western Michigan Broncos earned a spot in the 2016 MAC Championship Game after winning the MAC West outright by defeating Toledo 55–35 in their final home game. Under fourth year head coach P. J. Fleck, the Broncos finished the regular season with a perfect record, defeating both Big Ten Conference teams they faced (Northwestern and Illinois). The Broncos also defeated archrival Central Michigan for the third straight year by a score of 49–10.

Game summary
The Broncos opened the game with two first-quarter field goals, and the first quarter ended 6–0 in favor of the undefeated Broncos. Western Michigan had outscored opponents 135–59 in the first quarter during the season. They started the second quarter with their third field goal of the game, and extended their lead to nine. Ohio got on the scoreboard in the second quarter with an eight-yard touchdown pass from quarterback Greg Windham to Jordan Reid and cut the Broncos' lead to three, the closest the game had been since WMU's first field goal. The Broncos responded with two passing touchdowns and led at the half, 23–7. The Bobcats opened the third quarter with a touchdown inside the first two minutes to bring Ohio within 10 points as the extra point was no good. Broncos' kicker Butch Hampton responded with just under 3:30 left in the quarter with his fourth field goal of the game. The Bobcats cut the lead to six points with just over a minute left in the third quarter as Windham connected with Papi White for a 31-yard touchdown pass and the third quarter ended with Western Michigan leading 26–20. Ohio cut the Broncos' lead to three with 7:14 left in the final quarter after Louie Zervos kicked his first field goal of the game, from 37 yards. WMU kicker Butch Hampton improved to five-for-five on field goals on the game with 1:24 left in the fourth quarter to extend Western Michigan's lead to six. Ohio's would-be game-winning drive was abruptly cut short when Windham's pass was intercepted over the middle by Robert Spillane with 0:51 left in the game. Western Michigan took over and ran out the clock to with the MAC Championship.

Scoring summary

Statistics

References

Championship Game
MAC Championship Game
Ohio Bobcats football games
Western Michigan Broncos football games
American football competitions in Detroit
December 2016 sports events in the United States
MAC Championship
MAC Championship